Daniel M. Fleetwood (born August 3, 1958) is an American scientist, inventor, engineer and innovator. He is credited as being one of the first to identify the origins of flicker noise in semiconductor devices and its usefulness in understanding the effects of ionizing radiation on microelectronic devices and materials.

Fleetwood is the Olin H. Landreth Chair of Electrical Engineering at Vanderbilt University in Nashville, Tennessee. His research work focuses on the effects of ionizing radiation on microelectronic devices and materials, origins of 1/f noise in semiconductors and radiation hardness assurance. In 1997 he received R&D 100 and IndustryWeek magazine awards for co-inventing a new type of computer memory chip based on mobile protons. The chip was recognized as Discover magazine's 1998 Invention of the Year in computer hardware and electronics. In 2000 he was named one of the top 250 most highly cited researchers in engineering by the Institute for Scientific Information. He is a Fellow of the Institute of Electrical and Electronics Engineers and American Physical Society, and a Grandmaster of International Correspondence Chess.

Early life and education 
Fleetwood was born on August 3, 1958 in Surprise, Indiana to Louis and Dorothy Fleetwood. He graduated from Seymour High School (Indiana) in 1976. He took active interest in sports and was a member of the Seymour High School baseball team, pitching a perfect game in 1976. He joined Department of Physics and Applied Mathematics in Purdue University as an undergraduate. He graduated from Purdue in 1984 with a PhD in physics. He received the 1984 Lark-Horovitz Award, Purdue University in recognition of demonstrated ability and exceptional promise in research in solid-state physics.

Career

Sandia National Laboratories 
Fleetwood joined Sandia National Laboratories, Albuquerque, New Mexico in 1984. He was named a Distinguished Member of the Technical Staff in the Radiation Technology and Assurance Department in 1990. In 1997 he received R&D 100 and IndustryWeek magazine awards for co-invention of a new type of computer memory chip based on mobile protons in Silicon dioxide (protonic nonvolatile field effect transistor memory). This chip was also recognized as Discover magazine's 1998 Invention of the Year in computer hardware and electronics. In 2000 he was named one of the top 250 most highly cited researchers in Engineering by the Institute for Scientific Information.

Vanderbilt University 
In 1999 Fleetwood left Sandia to accept the position of Professor of Electrical Engineering at Vanderbilt University in Nashville, Tennessee. In 2000, he was also named a Professor of Physics, in 2001 he was appointed Associate Dean for Research of the Vanderbilt School of Engineering, and from June 2003 through June 2020 he was Chair of the Electrical Engineering and Computer Science Department. He is associated with The Radiation Effects and Reliability Group at Vanderbilt which is the largest of its type at any US university. and Institute for Space and Defense Electronics. His research interests are Effects of ionizing radiation on microelectronic devices and materials, Flicker noise in semiconductors, radiation hardness assurance test methods for mission-critical equipments, radiation effects modeling and simulation and novel microelectronic materials. Fleetwood is the author of more than 600 publications on radiation effects in microelectronics, defects in semiconductor devices, and low-frequency noise. These papers have been cited more than 26000 times (citation h factor = 89, per Google Scholar). He was named an Honorary Professor of the Shanghai Institute of Microsystem and Information Technology, Chinese Academy of Sciences in 2011. He currently serves as Senior Editor, Radiation Effects, of the IEEE Transactions on Nuclear Science and Distinguished Lectures Chair of the IEEE Nuclear and Plasma Sciences Society.

Awards and honors 
 Fellow, Institute of Electrical and Electronics Engineers, American Physical Society, and American Association for the Advancement of Science
 Merit Award, IEEE Nuclear and Plasma Sciences Society, 2009
 Distinguished Science Alumnus, Purdue University, 2007
 Discover magazine (1998), R&D Magazine R&D 100 (1997) and IndustryWeek magazine Technology of Year (1997) Awards
 More than 20 Outstanding/Meritorious Conference Paper Awards for IEEE Conferences 
 Distinguished Member of the Technical Staff, Sandia National Laboratories, 1990–1999
 Lark-Horovitz Award, Purdue University, 1984

Other achievements 

Fleetwood became the eighth US Correspondence Chess Grandmaster in 2008, beating Poland's SM Maciej Jedrzejowski. His chess talent was recognized when he captured the ACUI Midwest regional Collegiate Chess Championship in 1981 and then the United States Chess Federation's premier correspondence tournament, the 1993 Absolute Championship. He is currently competing in the 33rd World Championship of the International Correspondence Chess Federation (ICCF).

Personal life 

Daniel is married to Betsy Fleetwood and together they have three sons: Aaron，Zach and Nathan. The family lives in Brentwood, Tennessee.

References

External links

 

1958 births
Living people
American chess players
Correspondence chess grandmasters
Vanderbilt University faculty
Sandia National Laboratories people
Fellow Members of the IEEE
Purdue University alumni
Computer engineers
21st-century American engineers
21st-century American physicists
20th-century American inventors
21st-century American inventors
People from Jackson County, Indiana